One of the largest Vietnamese neighborhoods in Philadelphia is located in Passyunk Square, a neighborhood in South Philadelphia.

The heart of the Vietnamese community is centered on the intersection of Eighth Street and Washington Avenue in South Philadelphia   with "one of the largest Vietnamese populations on the east coast."  and is a district where "... neon signs lure shoppers into grocery stores, restaurants and karaoke bars set back from the street in low-rise concrete strip malls. Shoppers pushing carts laden with rice noodles, bean cakes and imported spices and sauces pack suburban-style parking lots behind the complexes."  The author further states that the Vietnamese are now (as of 2013) the largest ethnic community in the Washington Avenue/Passyunk Square section of the city and that the entire Vietnamese population of Philadelphia is larger than that of New York City.

Southwest Philadelphia and Northeast Philadelphia also contain Vietnamese American neighborhoods. Mimicking Little Saigon is Baby Saigon, a small Vietnamese neighborhood located within in Whitman neighborhood of South Philadelphia. Meanwhile, the Vietnamese community has additionally expanded eastward across the Delaware River to Camden and Cherry Hill in New Jersey.

Background
According to Ariel Diliberto, a Temple University anthropology scholar, "... the strip malls are typical of Vietnamese business communities across the U.S."  Diliberto points out that the architecture "... is an idealization of American enterprise among South Vietnamese frustrated under communism and inspired by the 'simple, geometric high-rise buildings' constructed in Vietnamese towns and cities during the Vietnam war."  Unlike other Vietnamese enclaves in the US, "... there’s no gaudy, generically 'Asian' archway entreating the passersby to explore, just a string of unannounced shopping malls and a smattering of nearby businesses integrated into the ever-evolving immigrant territory of the Italian Market and the building materials bazaar along Washington Avenue."

History
Starting from the 1990s, the Vietnamese shopping areas started with Hoa Binh Plaza, followed by Wing Phat Plaza, both of which were dwarfed in 1998 with the construction of the New World Plaza and 1st Oriental Market.  According to Dilberto who quotes Pappas that the origins of the Little Saigon closely follow the patterns seen in "...  Westminster (a suburb of LA) and Falls Church (a suburb of DC)."

See also
 Vietnamese American
 Chinatown, Philadelphia
 Koreatown, Philadelphia
 Italian Market, Philadelphia, a neighborhood within which Little Saigon is intertwined.
 Washington Avenue Historic District (Philadelphia, Pennsylvania)

Gallery

References

Neighborhoods in Philadelphia
Ethnic enclaves in the United States
Vietnamese-American history
Little Saigons
Asian-American culture in Pennsylvania